Alfred Büchi (born 2 April 1909, date of death unknown) was a Swiss racing cyclist. He rode in the 1932 Tour de France.

References

1909 births
Year of death missing
Swiss male cyclists
Place of birth missing